Edward J. Viall (c. 1890 – March 28, 1950) was a Michigan politician.

Political life
The Flint City Commission selected him as mayor in 1946 and select again for another year.

References

Mayors of Flint, Michigan
1950 deaths
1890s births
20th-century American politicians